Robert Coolen (born January 24, 1958)  is an American softball coach who is currently the head coach of the University of Hawaii's softball program.

Personal life and education  
A native of Somerville, Massachusetts, Coolen was a multi-sport athlete at Wesleyan University, where he played wide receiver on the school's football team, a pitcher on the baseball team, and a member of the swim team. He turned down an appointment from the United States Naval Academy to play at Wesleyan. He graduated from Wesleyan in 1980 with a degree in government and earned a master's degree in human movement from Boston University in 1986. Coolen and his wife Nanci have two children, Demi and Bo. Bo was the associate head coach for the baseball team at Westcliff University. He has since moved to Grace College as co-head coach of the softball team with his wife Sam.

Coaching career  
Coolen started his coaching career at Bentley University in Waltham, Massachusetts, working as the head coach of the university's softball team and swimming team. In addition to his duties as the head coach of the two teams, Coolen also served as the equipment and facilities manager. Coolen left Bentley to join Rayla Allison's coaching staff at Hawaii in 1990 as an assistant.

Hawaii 
After Allison resigned to become the first full-time executive director of the National Fastpitch Coaches Association, Coolen was named the head coach of the Wahine softball team in 1992.

Coolen and his staff led a 2010 Wahine squad that shattered the record for most home runs by a team in a single season, en route to a WAC championship and a berth in the NCAA tournament. Following a win in the Tuscaloosa regional over #1 seed Alabama, Hawaii advanced to the Women's College World Series, the Wahine's first and only Women's College World Series appearance to date.

Coolen earned his 1000th win on April 13th, 2019 with a 5–2 win over UC Santa Barbara, joining Dave Shoji, Les Murakami, and Jim Schwitters as the only coaches to win 1,000 games in the history of the university's athletic department.

Head coaching record

Notes

See also 
 List of college softball coaches with 1,000 wins

References

External links  
Hawaii profile

1958 births
Living people
Sportspeople from Somerville, Massachusetts
American football wide receivers
Wesleyan Cardinals baseball players
Wesleyan Cardinals football players
Wesleyan University alumni
Boston University alumni
Bentley Falcons softball coaches
American swimming coaches
Hawaii Rainbow Wahine softball coaches
Softball coaches from Massachusetts